The Fred Bartell House is a historic house at 324 East Twin Springs Street in Siloam Springs, Arkansas. Built c. 1900, it is a -story wood-frame structure, with asymmetrical massing typical of the Queen Anne style.  It has a low octagonal turret at the front left, and a porch, supported by Tuscan columns mounted on a lattice of concrete blocks that form a low balustrade. The house is clad in novelty siding.

The house was listed on the National Register of Historic Places in 1988.

See also
National Register of Historic Places listings in Benton County, Arkansas

References

Houses on the National Register of Historic Places in Arkansas
Queen Anne architecture in Arkansas
Neoclassical architecture in Arkansas
Houses completed in 1900
Houses in Siloam Springs, Arkansas
National Register of Historic Places in Benton County, Arkansas